Bajrić is a Bosnian patronymic surname and may refer to:
 Edin Bajrić (born 1980), Bosnian painter and sculptor
 Kenan Bajrić (born 1994), Slovenian footballer

References

Bosnian surnames
Patronymic surnames